Regurgitation is the expulsion of material from the pharynx, or esophagus, usually characterized by the presence of undigested food or blood.

Regurgitation is used by a number of species to feed their young. This is typically in circumstances where the young are at a fixed location and a parent must forage or hunt for food, especially under circumstances where the carriage of small prey would be subject to robbing by other predators or the whole prey is larger than can be carried to a den or nest. Some bird species also occasionally regurgitate pellets of indigestible matter such as bones and feathers.

It is in most animals a normal and voluntary process unlike the complex vomiting reflex in response to toxins.

Humans
In humans it can be voluntary or involuntary, the latter being due to a small number of disorders. Regurgitation of a person's meals following ingestion is known as rumination syndrome, an uncommon and often misdiagnosed motility disorder that affects eating. It may be a symptom of gastroesophageal reflux disease (GERD).

In infants, regurgitation – or spitting up – is quite common, with 67% of 4-month-old infants spitting up more than once per day.

Some people are able to regurgitate without using any external stimulation or drug, by means of muscle control. Practitioners of yoga have also been known to do this. Professional regurgitators perfect the ability to such a degree as to be able to exploit it as entertainment.

Birds

For birds that transport food to their mates and/or their young over long distances — especially seabirds — it is impractical to carry food in their bills because of the risk that it would be stolen by other birds, such as frigatebirds, skuas and gulls. Such birds often employ a regurgitative feeding strategy. Many species of gulls have an orange to red spot near the end of the bill (called a "subterminal spot") that the chicks peck in order to stimulate regurgitation.

All of the Suliformes employ a regurgitative strategy to feed their young. In some species — such as the blue-footed booby, masked booby, and the Nazca booby —  a brood hierarchy exists, in which the older chick is fed before the younger, subordinate chick. In times when food is scarce, siblicide may occur, where the dominant chick kills its younger sibling in order to sequester all of the resources of the parents. Penguins chicks are fed regurgitated food by both parents. Researchers found that the practice may potentially cause metabolic alkalosis in certain penguins.

Some birds, such as fulmars, employ regurgitation as a defense when threatened.

Other animals
Ruminants regurgitate their food as a normal part of digestion. During their idle time, they chew the regurgitated food (cud) and swallow it again, which increases digestibility by reducing particle size.

Honey is produced by a process of regurgitation by honey bees, which is stored in the beehive as a primary food source.

See also 
 Trophallaxis

References

Eating behaviors
Articles containing video clips